Gamasolaelaps excisus is a species of mite in the family Veigaiidae.

References

Mesostigmata
Articles created by Qbugbot
Animals described in 1879